Lycée Français de Tamatave is a French international school in Toamasina, Madagascar.

History and operations
It serves école maternelle (preschool) through lycée (senior high school).

The school was established in 1973.

See also

 Education in Madagascar
 List of international schools
 French people in Madagascar
 List of international schools in Madagascar

References

External links
 , the school's official website
 

1973 establishments in Madagascar
Educational institutions established in 1973
Elementary and primary schools in Madagascar
French international schools in Madagascar
International high schools
Toamasina
High schools and secondary schools in Madagascar